Høvikodden is a headland in Bærum municipality, Norway, by the Oslofjord near the populated area Høvik, whence its name was taken.

It is the site of the Henie Onstad Kunstsenter. A small beach is nearby.

Further east are the headquarters of the classification company Det Norske Veritas.

Høvikodden Beach
It has fine sand and a plunge brew out on the headland to the west. There is a sculpture park outside the arts center. There are coastal path in both directions.

Bærum
Millennium sites